Elections were held in the Australian state of Queensland on 11 May 1935 to elect the 62 members of the state's Legislative Assembly. The Labor government of Premier William Forgan Smith was seeking a second term after having defeated the Country and Progressive National Party in the 1932 election.

Labor received a significant swing and gained 13 seats. The election took place on new boundaries for the second election in a row.

Key dates

Results

Seats changing party representation
This table lists changes in party representation at the 1935 election.

 Members listed in italics did not recontest their seats.
 The CPNP sitting member for Cook, James Kenny instead contested the seat of Sandgate and lost.
 The CPNP sitting member for Kennedy, Arthur Fadden instead contested the seat of Mirani and lost.
 The CPNP sitting member for the abolished district of Murilla, Godfrey Morgan contested the seat of Dalby and won.

See also
 Members of the Queensland Legislative Assembly, 1932–1935
 Members of the Queensland Legislative Assembly, 1935–1938
 Candidates of the Queensland state election, 1935
 Forgan Smith Ministry

References

Elections in Queensland
1935 elections in Australia
1930s in Queensland
May 1935 events